The 1985 Stanley Cup playoffs, the playoff tournament of the National Hockey League (NHL) began on April 10, after the conclusion of the 1984–85 NHL season. The playoffs concluded on May 30 with the champion Edmonton Oilers defeating the Philadelphia Flyers 8–3 to win the final series four games to one and win the Stanley Cup.

Playoff seeds

The following teams qualified for the playoffs:

Prince of Wales Conference

Adams Division
 Montreal Canadiens, Adams Division champions – 94 points
 Quebec Nordiques – 91 points
 Buffalo Sabres – 90 points
 Boston Bruins – 82 points

Patrick Division
 Philadelphia Flyers, Patrick Division champions, Prince of Wales Conference regular season champions – 113 points
 Washington Capitals – 101 points
 New York Islanders – 86 points
 New York Rangers – 62 points

Clarence Campbell Conference

Norris Division
 St. Louis Blues, Norris Division champions – 86 points
 Chicago Black Hawks – 83 points
 Detroit Red Wings – 66 points
 Minnesota North Stars – 62 points

Smythe Division
 Edmonton Oilers, Smythe Division champions, Clarence Campbell Conference regular season champions – 109 points
 Winnipeg Jets – 96 points
 Calgary Flames – 94 points
 Los Angeles Kings – 82 points

Playoff bracket

Division Semifinals

Prince of Wales Conference

(A1) Montreal Canadiens vs. (A4) Boston Bruins

This was the 20th playoff series between these two teams. Montreal lead 17–2 in previous playoff series meetings. This was a rematch of last year's Adams Division Semifinals, in which Montreal won in a three-game sweep.

In the series finale, the Canadiens got the only goal when Mats Naslund scored with just 51 seconds remaining in regulation. Steve Penney stopped all 20 shots to register the shutout.

(A2) Quebec Nordiques vs. (A3) Buffalo Sabres

This was the second playoff series meeting between these two teams. This was a rematch of last year's Adams Division Semifinals, in which Quebec won in a three-game sweep.

In the final game, Buffalo led 5–3 with just nine minutes remaining but allowed the Nordiques to score two goals in a span of 64 seconds to tie it at 12:06. The Nordiques' Brent Ashton then got the winner with only 69 seconds left.

(P1) Philadelphia Flyers vs. (P4) New York Rangers

This was the sixth playoff series between these two teams. New York won three of the previous five meetings. Their last meeting was won by New York in a three-game sweep in the 1983 Patrick Division Semifinals.

(P2) Washington Capitals vs. (P3) New York Islanders

This was the third playoff series meeting between these two teams. New York won both previous series over the past two seasons, including last year's Patrick Division Finals in five games.

The series comeback by the Islanders is the only instance in NHL history a team has overcome a 2–0 series deficit to win a best-of-five series.

Clarence Campbell Conference

(N1) St. Louis Blues vs. (N4) Minnesota North Stars

This was the sixth playoff series meeting between these two teams. St. Louis won three of the previous five series. This was a rematch of last year's Norris Division Finals in which Minnesota won in seven games.

(N2) Chicago Black Hawks vs. (N3) Detroit Red Wings

This was the tenth playoff series meeting between these two teams. Chicago has won five of the previous nine series. Their most recent meeting was in the 1970 Stanley Cup Quarterfinals in a four-game sweep.

(S1) Edmonton Oilers vs. (S4) Los Angeles Kings

This was the second playoff series between these two teams. Los Angeles won their only previous meeting in a stunning upset 3–2 in the 1982 Smythe Division Semifinals.

(S2) Winnipeg Jets vs. (S3) Calgary Flames

This was the first playoff series between these two teams.

Division Finals

Prince of Wales Conference

(A1) Montreal Canadiens vs. (A2) Quebec Nordiques

This was the third playoff series meeting between these two teams. Both teams split their prior two meetings. This was a rematch of last year's Adams Division Finals in which Montreal won in six games.

The Quebec Nordiques and Montreal Canadiens battled in a seven-game series. Bitter rivals from the province of Quebec, the Nords shocked the Habs in 1982, only to see a fourth-place Montreal club upset Quebec two years later. In the deciding seventh game at the Montreal Forum, Peter Stastny scored the game and series winning goal, giving Quebec an improbable 3–2 overtime win and berth in the Wales Conference Finals. The franchise did not get to the conference finals again until 1996, their first year as the Colorado Avalanche. They won the Stanley Cup.

(P1) Philadelphia Flyers vs. (P3) New York Islanders

This was the third playoff series meeting between these two teams. Both teams split their previous two meetings. New York won the most recent meeting in six games in the 1980 Stanley Cup Finals.

The Philadelphia Flyers ended the New York Islanders' string of five straight seasons in the Stanley Cup Finals by dispatching the club four games to one. Flyers goaltender Pelle Lindbergh registered a pair of shutouts, one in the first game and the other in the clinching fifth game, by a 1–0 score.

Clarence Campbell Conference

(N2) Chicago Black Hawks vs. (N4) Minnesota North Stars

This was the fourth playoff series meeting between these two teams. Chicago won two of the previous three meetings over the past three seasons. Minnesota won last season's Norris Division Semifinals 3–2.

The Chicago Black Hawks simply outscored the Minnesota North Stars in an offensive-minded six-game series that featured 62 total goals.

(S1) Edmonton Oilers vs. (S2) Winnipeg Jets

This was the third playoff series meeting between these two teams. Edmonton won the previous two meetings over the past two seasons, including last year's Smythe Division Semifinals in a three-game sweep.

Defending Cup champion Edmonton was too much for the Winnipeg Jets, sweeping them in four straight games and doubling their goal total.

Conference Finals

Prince of Wales Conference Final

(P1) Philadelphia Flyers vs. (A2) Quebec Nordiques

This was the second playoff series meeting between these two teams. Philadelphia won the only previous meeting 3–2 in the 1981 Preliminary Round.

Although the Flyers held the best record in the NHL with 53 wins and 113 points, the Adams Division held a better record against the Patrick Division, so the Wales finals began in Quebec City. Philadelphia and Quebec split the first four games of the series, then the Flyers edged the Nordiques, 2–1 in game five. Game six in Philadelphia was a tour-de-force for the Flyers, outshooting Quebec 36–15, and winning 3–0. Flyers captain Dave Poulin's five-on-three shorthanded goal early in the second period sealed the win and returned to the Stanley Cup Finals for the first time since 1980.  The win came at a high cost for the Flyers as both 54-goal forward Tim Kerr and defenceman Brad McCrimmon were lost for the remainder of the playoffs with injuries.

Clarence Campbell Conference Final

(S1) Edmonton Oilers vs. (N2) Chicago Black Hawks

This was the second playoff series meeting between these two teams. Edmonton won the only previous meeting in a four-game sweep in the 1983 Clarence Campbell Conference Final.

The Oilers defeated the Black Hawks in a six-game series which broke all sorts of records for total offense. Edmonton won the first two games at home by 11–2 and 7–3 scores, only to see Chicago strike back at home with 5–2 and 8–6 victories. However, Edmonton rebounded to blast the Hawks in the final two games, 10–5 and 8–2 to earn their third trip to the Cup Finals in as many years.  Edmonton set all-time playoff marks with most goals in one series, most goals in a six-game series, and both clubs set records with most total goals in a semifinal series and most total goals in one six-game series. Oilers' Jari Kurri scored three hat tricks in the series, setting a still-standing NHL record.

Stanley Cup Finals 

This was the second playoff series between these two teams. Their only previous meeting was in the 1980 Preliminary Round, which Philadelphia won in a three-game sweep. Philadelphia made their fifth Finals appearance. They last appeared in the Finals in 1980, which Philadelphia lost against the New York Islanders in six games. This was Edmonton's third consecutive and third overall Finals appearance. They won the previous year's Finals against the New York Islanders in five games. Philadelphia won all three games in this year's regular season series.

Player statistics

Skaters
These are the top ten skaters based on points.

Goaltenders
This is a combined table of the top five goaltenders based on goals against average and the top five goaltenders based on save percentage, with at least 420 minutes played. The table is sorted by GAA, and the criteria for inclusion are bolded.

See also
1984–85 NHL season
List of NHL seasons
List of Stanley Cup champions

References

 

playoffs
Stanley Cup playoffs